Bruno Coppi  (born 19 November 1935 in Gonzaga, Lombardy, Italy) is an Italian-American physicist specializing in plasma physics.

In 1959, Coppi attained an Italian doctoral degree at Polytechnic University of Milan and was subsequently a docent and research scientist at the Polytechnic Institute and the University of Milan. In 1961, he was a scientist at the Princeton Plasma Physics Laboratory. From 1964 to 1967, he was an assistant professor at the University of California, San Diego, from 1967 to 1969 at the Institute for Advanced Study, and from 1968 professor at the Massachusetts Institute of Technology. In the 1980s, Coppi was a member of the science team in the Voyager 2 space probe.

Coppi works on theoretical plasma physics, space plasmas and magnetic fusion. At MIT, he initiated the Alcator Program, which led to the Russian-American Ignitor program, that aims at building near Moscow a fusion reactor with Coppi as the principal investigator for the project. In addition, Coppi is taking a leading role in the Frascati Torus Program in Italy.

Awards 
In 1987, Coppi received the James Clerk Maxwell Prize for Plasma Physics and also the Award of Excellence in Plasma Physics from the American Physical Society. He is a member of the American Academy of Arts and Sciences (since 1976), the American Association for the Advancement of Science, the National Virgilian Academy of Sciences, Letters and Arts and a fellow of the American Physical Society. He received the American Dante Alighieri Prize, the Science Prize of the Italian government, the science and technology prize from Italgas, and the gold medal of the Milan Polytechnic Institute.

In 2000, he was knighted Grand Officer of the Order of Merit of the Italian Republic.

In 2016, Coppi won the Antonio Feltrinelli International Prize for Chemistry and Physics from the Accademia nazionale dei Lincei.

References

External links 
Oral history interview transcript with Bruno Coppi on 28 April 2020, American Institute of Physics, Niels Bohr Library & Archives
Biography from the APS
Website for Coppi at MIT

1935 births
Living people
People from the Province of Mantua
21st-century American physicists
Massachusetts Institute of Technology faculty
20th-century Italian physicists
Italian emigrants to the United States
Theoretical physicists
Grand Officers of the Order of Merit of the Italian Republic
Fellows of the American Physical Society